Surgeon Major Francis Stephen Bennet Francois de Chaumont  (7 April 1833 – 18 April 1888) was a British Army surgeon.

Life 
de Chaumont was born in Edinburgh to a Scottish mother and French father. He was educated at Edinburgh High School and the University of Edinburgh.

He entered the British Army medical service and was posted as assistant surgeon in 1854 to the Depot Battalion, Parkhurst Barracks, Isle of Wight. In 1885 he served with the Rifle Brigade in the Crimean War and was present at the Siege of Sevastopol. He again served with the Rifle Brigade during the Indian Mutiny (1856–61) and for a year in Malta (1861–62).

When the Army Medical School was moved from Chatham, Kent to Netley, Hampshire Surgeon Major de Chaumont was appointed in 1866 Assistant Professor of Military Hygiene, being later retired on half-pay in 1876 when made Professor on the death of his predecessor, Professor Edmund Parkes.

He was elected a Fellow of the Royal Society on 12 June 1879.

He died in 1888 at his house in Woolston, Southampton and was buried at St Mary Extra, Sholing. He had married Eleanor Tempest Gray in 1865 and had a large family.

References

1833 births
1888 deaths
Military personnel from Edinburgh
Alumni of the University of Edinburgh
Royal Army Medical Corps officers
British Army personnel of the Crimean War
Fellows of the Royal Society
Rifle Brigade officers
British military personnel of the Indian Rebellion of 1857